François 'Bitzi' Konter (20 February 1934 – 29 August 2018) was a Luxembourgian footballer.

Club career
Konter started his career at local team Chiers Rodange but played much of his club football in Belgium, for RSC Anderlecht and AA Gent.

International career
He played for Luxembourg's national team at the height of the country's footballing strength, making his debut in October 1955 against Switzerland, and was an integral part of the team that almost reached the semi-finals of the 1964 European Championship.

During his international career, Konter played 77 games and scored four goals. He played in 16 FIFA World Cup qualification matches.

He was the country's all-time record cap holder from November 1966 until November 1995 when Carlo Weis overtook his tally. He played his final international game in April 1969, in a World Cup qualifier against Bulgaria.

International goals
Scores and results list Luxembourg's goal tally first.

Honours
Belgian First Division: 4
 1962, 1964, 1965, 1966

Belgian Cup: 1
 1965

Personal life
Konter married Ginette Faber in 1981. They have one daughter, Nadine. His grandson Yannick Bianchini played for Jeunesse Esch and UN Käerjeng 97.

External links
 Bio - Profootball

References

1934 births
2018 deaths
People from Differdange
Luxembourgian footballers
Luxembourgian expatriate footballers
Luxembourg international footballers
R.S.C. Anderlecht players
K.A.A. Gent players
Belgian Pro League players
Expatriate footballers in Belgium
Luxembourgian expatriate sportspeople in Belgium
Association football central defenders